Toby Shawn Borland (born May 29, 1969) is an American former professional baseball relief pitcher, who played in Major League Baseball (MLB) between  and  for the Philadelphia Phillies (1994-), New York Mets, Boston Red Sox (1997), Anaheim Angels, and Florida Marlins. He batted and threw right-handed.

Borland was a 16-year veteran, who divided his playing time between the MLB and minor leagues. He was 24 years old when he reached the majors in 1994 with the Philadelphia Phillies, spending three seasons with them before moving to the Mets (1997) and Red Sox (1997). After a new stint with Philadelphia (1998), he worked with the Angels (2001) and Marlins (2002). His most productive season came in 1996 for the Phillies, when he had a 7–3 mark while recording career-highs in games pitched (69), innings (90) and strikeouts (76). He was the last Phillies player to wear the uniform number 42 before it was retired out of respect to Jackie Robinson.

In a nine-season major league career, Borland posted an 11–9 record with a 4.17 ERA and eight saves in 207 appearances.

External links

Toby Borland at Baseball Almanac
Toby Borland at Baseball Gauge
Toby Borland at Ultimate Mets Database

1969 births
Living people
Albuquerque Isotopes players
American expatriate baseball players in Canada
Anaheim Angels players
Baseball players from Louisiana
Boston Red Sox players
Calgary Cannons players
Charlotte Knights players
Clearwater Phillies players
Edmonton Trappers players
Erie SeaWolves players
Florida Marlins players
Major League Baseball pitchers
Memphis Redbirds players
New York Mets players
Pawtucket Red Sox players
Philadelphia Phillies players
Reading Phillies players
Salt Lake Stingers players
Scranton/Wilkes-Barre Red Barons players
Sportspeople from Ruston, Louisiana